Hunter's Handbook TV is an extension of Hunter’s Handbook, the award-winning, official student publication of the International Hunter Education Association. Each HHTV episode invites experts in the hunting and shooting sports to the workshop to teach and inform viewers on becoming better hunters.

Each show gives detailed instruction on two different subjects, from choosing the right rifle or shotgun; handgun hunting; navigation; survival and many other disciplines. The show is a combination of education and fast-paced hunting and shooting scenes that illustrate how much fun the sport can be. In addition, each episode concludes with the “Safety Tip of the Week,” presented by some of the foremost hunting education experts in America.

The show is owned by John Gallaspy.

American sports television series
Works about survival skills